{{Speciesbox
| status = VU 
| status_system = IUCN3.1
| status_ref = 
| taxon = Microkayla adenopleura
| authority = (Aguayo-Vedia and Harvey, 2001)
| synonyms = 
 Phrynopus adenopleurus Aguayo-Vedia and Harvey, 2001
 Psychrophrynella adenopleura (Aguayo-Vedia and Harvey, 2001)
}}Microkayla adenopleura'' is a species of frog in the family Strabomantidae. It is endemic to Bolivia and only known from near its type locality in the Carrasco National Park, Cochabamba Department, at elevations of  asl.
It is a common species living in low, humid montane forest typical to the transition between Yungas forest and páramo. Outside the national park, if present, it would be threatened by habitat loss.

References

Amphibians of the Andes
Amphibians of Bolivia
Endemic fauna of Bolivia
Páramo fauna
Taxonomy articles created by Polbot
Amphibians described in 2001